The Montgomery Ward Building is a historic department store building in downtown Pueblo, Colorado.  It was listed on the National Register of Historic Places in 1996.  Currently used as an office building, it houses the American Bank of Commerce, the Colorado Lottery, and the Pueblo Work Force Center.  Previously it was occupied by QualMed as its headquarters.

It was built in 1936.  It is a two-story  building.  The building was deemed notable "as an intact example of the Montgomery Ward Company's standard Georgian Revival corporate style used for its department stores from 1933 to 1948";  it is the only example of the Montgomery Ward Georgian Revival style in the state.

See also
Henkel-Duke Mercantile Company Warehouse, also known as "Montgomery Ward Warehouse", also in Pueblo and NRHP-listed
Montgomery Ward

References

National Register of Historic Places
The Greater Pueblo Chamber Website
American Bank of Commerce sets up shop in historic Pueblo, Colo., building
Colorado Historical Society

Commercial buildings on the National Register of Historic Places in Colorado
Georgian Revival architecture in Colorado
Commercial buildings completed in 1936
Office buildings in Colorado
Department stores on the National Register of Historic Places
Headquarters in the United States
Montgomery Ward
Retail buildings in Colorado
National Register of Historic Places in Pueblo, Colorado